Evan Malbone Johnson (June 6, 1791 - March 19, 1865) was a clergyman of the Episcopal Church in the United States of America. Born in Bristol, Rhode Island, he was ordained to the deaconate and priesthood by Bishop Alexander Viets Griswold. Often referred to as "Dominie" Johnson, he built Saint John's Church at 139 St Johns Place, Park Slope, Brooklyn, New York in 1826, and served that parish for 21 years as its rector without pay. Saint John's Church was consecrated on July 10, 1827, by Bishop John Henry Hobart. In 1847 Johnson established Saint Michael's Church, also in Brooklyn. He served that parish until his death. He was a prolific writer in the cautious pre-ritualist High Church school of Anglicanism. Johnson baptized William Edmond Armitage, later second Bishop of Wisconsin (1870-1873).

Johnson was the American editor of the influential A History of the Protestant Episcopal Church in America, by Samuel Wilberforce, Bishop of Oxford.

Johnson's grandson Evan M. Johnson (1861-1923) was a career officer in the United States Army who attained the rank of brigadier general.

References

External links
 Documents by E.M. Johnson from Project Canterbury

American Episcopal priests
1791 births
1865 deaths
People from Bristol County, Rhode Island
19th-century American Episcopalians
19th-century American clergy